The Warminster Branch is a railway line in the state of Pennsylvania. It was originally built by the North East Pennsylvania Railroad, a subsidiary of the North Pennsylvania Railroad, between 1872 and 1874. It was part of the Reading Company system from 1879 until 1976. Today it is owned by SEPTA and hosts Warminster Line commuter rail service. A later extension of the branch to New Hope, Pennsylvania is now the New Hope Railroad heritage railway.

History 
The North East Pennsylvania Railroad was incorporated on December 14, 1870, to build northeast from the North Pennsylvania Railroad's main line at Glenside to Hatboro. A further  extension to Hartsville, Pennsylvania, opened on November 9, 1874. The Philadelphia and Reading Railroad leased the North Pennsylvania Railroad on May 14, 1879. Under Reading control, the line was extended to New Hope on March 29, 1891.

Under the Reading the line was known as the New Hope Branch. The North East Pennsylvania Railroad was one of twelve railroads merged into the Reading Company effective December 31, 1945. Passenger service beyond Hatboro ended on June 7, 1952. The New Hope and Ivyland Railroad purchased the section of the branch between Ivyland and New Hope on June 20, 1966, with the intention of running steam excursion service.

With the Reading's final bankruptcy in 1976, the New Hope and Ivyland acquired the section of the New Hope Branch between Ivyland and Warminster, while the Glenside–Warminster section was conveyed to Conrail. Conrail conveyed the line to SEPTA in 1979.

Notes

References 
 
 
 
 
 
 
 

SEPTA Regional Rail lines
Railway lines opened in 1872
Rail infrastructure in Pennsylvania
Reading Company lines